Bailey James Clements (born 15 November 2000) is an English professional footballer who plays as a left back for Chesterfield.

Career

Ipswich Town
Clements joined the Ipswich Town academy at the age of 7, he progressed through the youth set up at Portman Road, including captaining the club's U16 team. He signed his first professional contract on 18 August 2018, signing an 2-year deal. He made his first-team debut for the club in a 3–1 loss to Luton Town in an EFL Cup first round tie, on 13 August 2019. On 8 November 2019, he joined National League South side Hemel Hempstead Town on a one-month loan deal. On 27 February 2020, Ipswich took up the one-year extension option on Clements' contract, extending his stay at the club until 2021.

Dagenham & Redbridge (loan)
On 4 September, Clements joined National League side Dagenham & Redbridge on loan until January 2021. He left the Daggers in January 2021 after having appeared just once for the club in a FA Trophy game against Ebbsfleet United.

Return to Ipswich
In June 2021, Clements signed a new one-year contract at Ipswich, with the option of an additional years’ extension. He made his first appearance of the 2021–22 season in a 0–1 EFL Cup defeat against Newport County on 10 August. On 13 November, Clements made his league debut for Ipswich in a 0–0 home draw with Oxford United at Portman Road. Clements was released by the club at the end of the 2021–22 season.

Stevenage (loan)
On 31 January 2022, Clements joined League Two side Stevenage on loan until the end of the 2021–22 season.

Chesterfield
On 18 June 2022, Clements agreed to join National League club Chesterfield upon the expiration of his Ipswich Town contract.

Career statistics

References

External links

2000 births
Living people
Sportspeople from Ipswich
English footballers
Association football defenders
Ipswich Town F.C. players
Hemel Hempstead Town F.C. players
Dagenham & Redbridge F.C. players
Stevenage F.C. players
Chesterfield F.C. players
English Football League players